Aeolidia libitinaria is a species of sea slug in the family Aeolidiidae. It was found near a dead whale inside the Monteray Canyon, 380 meters below the ocean surface. It was named libitinaria, meaning "undertaker" in Latin.

References

Aeolidiidae
Gastropods described in 2018
Molluscs of the Pacific Ocean